The 2016 Uhrencup was a summer football friendly tournament. Matches were played in Grenchen and Biel. Swiss clubs Young Boys (Super League) and Zürich (Challenge League) were joined by Borussia Mönchengladbach (Germany) and Galatasaray (Turkey). It was the 52nd edition of the Uhrencup, but the first since 2013.

Overview

Participants

Standings
The tournament consisted of four matches, with three points given for a win, two for a penalty shoot-out win, one for a penalty shoot-out loss or a draw, and zero for a loss. A penalty shoot-out was used to determine the winners if tied after 90 minutes. However, after the final match between Galatasaray and Young Boys finished as a 1–1 draw, Galatasaray mathematically became champions, therefore no penalty shoot-out took place.

Matches

Goalscorers

Media coverage

See also
 Uhrencup

References

External links 

2016–17 in German football
2016–17 in Swiss football
2016–17 in Turkish football